Men's Combined World Cup 1981/1982

Calendar

Final point standings

In Men's Combined World Cup 1981/82 all 5 results count.

Note:

In all races not all points were awarded (not enough finishers).

Men's Combined Team Results

bold indicate highest score - italics indicate race wins

World Cup
FIS Alpine Ski World Cup men's combined discipline titles